Arnold of Torroja (? – 30 September 1184) was a knight of Crown of Aragon and the ninth Grand Master of the Knights Templar from 1181 until his death in 1184.

Personal life 
While no date of birth survives for Torroja; he was very old at his death, being in excess of 70 years when he was elected as Grand Master. He had served in the order for many years and was the Templar Master in both Crown of Aragon and Provence.

Biography 
Arnau de Torroja, brother of the Archbishop of Tarragona Guillem de Torroja, is Grand Master of the crown of Aragon and Provence when he is elected head of the Order in late 1180, to succeed Eudes de Saint-Amand, who died in captivity in Damascus. At that time Arnau de Torroja is over 58 years old, therefore he is a seasoned man in the discipline and in the operation of the Order. Essentially dedicated to the Reconquest of Spain, Arnaldo de Torroja does not know, or does not know it well, the political situation of the Latin States of the East.

His stage of government is marked by the quarrels that are fought between Templars and Hospitallers, since the latter do not cease to increase their influence and their political power.

Arnau de Torroja accepts the mediation of Pope Lucio III and Balduino IV to end these fratricidal struggles. In 1184, the political situation degenerated further, when Reinaldo de Châtillon aided by the Templars and Hospitallers, devastated the Muslim territories of Transjordan on his own. Arnaldo de Torroja will give evidence of a great political sagacity when negotiating a truce with Saladino, who is determined to avenge the incursions of Renaud de Châtillon.

Military Record

Reconquista 
Torroja's military career had mainly been focused on the Reconquista, fighting Muslims for the Crown of Aragon and for Portugal but was principally active in Catalonia and Aragon. His appointment as Grand Master was likely due to his image as an outsider i.e. an experienced Templar whose power base was outside the Holy Land. This appealed to the order as the previous Grand Master Odo de St Amand had become embroiled in Jerusalem's politics but it did mean that Torroja was inexperienced in the "political situation of the Latin States". He became the order's new leader in 1181.

Conflict with the Hospitallers 
During the Grand Master's reign the Knights Hospitaller reached a new peak in their influence. There had been rivalry between orders previously but factionalism in the face of renewed Muslim pressure was unacceptable. The two Grand Masters met for mediation with Pope Lucius III and King Baldwin IV and the problems were resolved. In fact Torroja is recorded as a skilled diplomat himself acting as a mediator between several political groups in the East. He also conducted successful peace negotiations with Saladin after raids by Raynald of Châtillon in Transjordan.

Embassy to Europe 
In 1184, Torroja set out with Patriarch Heraclius and Grand Master Roger de Moulins of the Knights Hospitaller to gather European support for the Kingdom of Jerusalem. They planned to visit Italy, England and France, but he fell ill and died at Verona on September 30, 1184. He was succeeded as Grand Master by Gérard de Ridefort.

Tomb 
In February 2018 was announced the discovery of a tomb in the San Fermo Maggiore church in Verona, which almost certainly is Arnold's final resting place. The tomb contained a stone sarcophagus with a cross pattée carved on it, itself containing a human body, and several analysis conducted by researchers of the Universities of Verona, Bologna and Nottingham together would confirm the identity of the deceased; it would be the first known tomb of a Templar Grand Master.

From preliminary analysis, the remains are those of a man in his fifties who lived around seven centuries ago, and who suffered from back pain and toothache. Along with the bones, remains of a dress of fine silk datable to the 12th century, as well as what looks like a shroud, further support the identification. The DNA from the bones will be compared with that of Arnold's brother, the then archbishop of Tarragona, Guillermo de Torroja.

References 

1184 deaths
People from Catalonia
Grand Masters of the Knights Templar
Year of birth unknown
1122 births